The 2017 FIM Ice Speedway Gladiators World Championship was the 2017 version of FIM Individual Ice Racing World Championship season. The world champion was determined by ten races hosted in five cities Tolyatti, Shadrinsk, Almaty, Berlin and Heerenveen between 7 January and 2 April 2017.

Final Series

Classification

See also 
 2017 Team Ice Racing World Championship
 2017 Speedway Grand Prix in classic speedway

References 

Ice speedway competitions
World